Chris Tibbs is a Canadian politician, who was elected to the Newfoundland and Labrador House of Assembly in the 2019 provincial election. He represents the electoral district of Grand Falls-Windsor-Buchans as a member of the Newfoundland and Labrador Progressive Conservative Party. He was re-elected in the 2021 provincial election.

As of September 2022, Tibbs is in the Newfoundland and Labrador shadow cabinet, with responsibilities for Digital Government and Service NL, OCIO, and Fire and Emergency Services NL.

Prior to politics, Tibbs worked as a paramedic. Since the mid-2000s, he has worked in the oil and gas sector.

Election results

References

Living people
Progressive Conservative Party of Newfoundland and Labrador MHAs
21st-century Canadian politicians
Year of birth missing (living people)